Felipe Rutini (December 3, 1866 – January 19, 1919) is best known as one of the four great Italian winemakers in Mendoza. and founder of "Rutini Wines", La Rural Winery and the Wine Museum of Mendoza.

Early life
Felipe attended the Royal School of Agriculture of Ascoli Piceno, where he obtained the degree of Agricultural Technician.
The Italian Risorgimento and the state of war in Europe drove him to the Americas and in 1884 he travelled to Mendoza, Argentina, where he settled.

Rutini acquired an estate in the district of Coquimbito, where he founded La Rural winery in 1885.

Personal life
In 1890 he married Ernesta Cremaschi, an Italian immigrant, whose family also worked in the wine industry. They gave birth to seven children. In the 1900s Felipe created a partnership with his sister-in-law’s husband, Ángel Cavagnaro, which boosted the business and led him to start producing and marketing wine on a larger scale.

Winery
Initially, the winery comprised two buildings and the family house. In 1910 he inaugurated new, spacious facilities to make the first Argentine high-end wines. State-of-the-art machinery was imported from Europe. Felipe Rutini’s growth strategy included expanding to new markets, mainly Buenos Aires and Santa Fe, Argentina.

Death and legacy
Felipe Rutini died in 1919 

After his death his descendants returned to Coquimbito to continue the work of Don Felipe and expand the business, guided by Doña Ernesta and her sons Francisco, Italo and Oscar.  In the 1930s they planted red and white varieties for high-end wines in their new estate in Tupungato and in their properties at Maipú and Rivadavia.

Within a few years the brands under Bodega La Rural became well known by consumers and produced wines including the famous "San Felipe" in its distinctive "canteen bottle" and "Felipe Rutini", launched on the 100th anniversary of the winery’s foundation.

References

1866 births
1919 deaths
Italian winemakers